Rachel Reenstra  is an American comedian, actress, and wildlife conservationist from Saugatuck, Michigan.

Education
Reenstra earned a Bachelor of Arts degree in theatre from Hope College in 1991 and a Master of Arts in spiritual psychology in 2001.

Career
Reenstra has played roles in various movies and television shows, including numerous sitcoms, dozens of commercials and has performed hundreds of voice overs and is a public speaker as well as a stand-up comedian. She is the current host of the weekend Disney–ABC Television Group  Three time Emmy-nominated series The Wildlife Docs in its fifth season filmed at Busch Gardens (Tampa) and on location at field sites around the world.  Reenstra was also the hostess of the Animal Planet reality television series and travel program Ms. Adventure which was a personality based program where she traveled the world comparing animal and human behavior. Reenstra is also known for hosting Designed to Sell (Atlanta team), which aired through 2010 for HGTV.

Filmography

Film

Television

Video games

References

External links

Official website

1970 births
Living people
American television personalities
American women television personalities
American television actresses
American film actresses
Actresses from Michigan
American women comedians
Hope College alumni
People from Saugatuck, Michigan
21st-century American comedians
21st-century American actresses